Framework Computer Inc, commonly referred to as Framework, is an American laptop manufacturer. The company positions itself as a proponent of the electronics right to repair movement, and their laptops are designed to be easy to disassemble, with replaceable parts. The company's approach has earned them praise from Louis Rossmann, Linus Sebastian, the latter having invested $225,000 into the company, and Cory Doctorow. In November 2021, Time magazine listed the Framework Laptop on their list of the 100 Best Inventions of 2021. Fast Company listed the Framework Laptop on their list of the Most Innovative Companies of 2022.

History 

In January 2020, the company was founded by Nirav Patel who was the head of hardware at Oculus. In the first half 2021, the company was funded with a $9 million seed round. In January 2022, the company was funded with an $18 million series A. The company shared their series A pitch deck with reducted parts.

Products

Framework Laptop 

In July 2021, Framework started to ship their first product Framework Laptop with an 11th Gen Intel Core i5 or i7 chip to the US and Canada. In December 2021, Framework opened pre-orders to the UK, Germany and France. In February 2022, pre-ordering became available for Ireland, Austria and The Netherlands. The Framework Laptop received a 10 out of 10 in iFixit's repairability score. The standard Framework Laptop ships as a fully assembled laptop, while the Framework Laptop DIY Edition ships with the RAM, storage, operating system, and in 11th Gen, the WiFi module uninstalled. All of these modules can be ordered with the DIY edition, or left out and purchased separately.

In May 2022, the company launched their second generation Framework Laptop with a 12th Gen Intel Core i5 or i7 chip that ships with an upgraded back panel, alongside their 12 Gen Upgrade Kit, to allow 11th Gen users to upgrade their laptops. In September 2022, pre-ordering became available for Australia. 

In September 2022, the company started to pre-order the Framework Laptop Chromebook Edition to the US and Canada.

Mainboard 

In April 2022, the company partly open sourced their mainboard with CAD and electrical documentation, being available in their marketplace, giving away 100 mainboards to makers and developers.

There does appear to be an issue with the first generation mainboard with 11th Gen Intel Core, that requires complete removal and reconnection of both main battery and RTC coin cell battery, if the laptop is not charged for a relatively short period of time. The company said that the issue is by 11th Gen Intel Core silicon bug, and they would work to swap out a replacement RTC coin cell battery or 11th Gen mainboard to the people seeing the issue.

Expansion Cards 

A core feature of the Framework Laptop is the detachable Expansion Cards that provide the primary input/output for the laptop. The laptop has four expansion slots that can each accept one of seven expansion cards. These consist of USB-C, USB-A, DisplayPort 1.4, HDMI 2.0b, 256GB storage expansion, 1TB storage expansion, MicroSD, and a 2.5GbE Ethernet expansion card In addition, each expansion slot has a recessed USB-C port, which can both be used to connect expansion cards, or as a standard USB-C port, though connecting a USB-C expansion card allows for easier access to the port. The company launched the Expansion Card Developer Program to open card development, released documentation, CAD templates, and reference designs for Expansion Cards, all under open source licenses to make it easy for both hardware companies and individual makers to create new card designs.

Firmware 

Framework Laptop uses a proprietary BIOS firmware, InsydeH2O UEFI BIOS by Insyde Software and an open sourced embedded controller (EC) firmware based on CrOS EC by Framework. In April 2021, the company mentioned that open source firmware was well aligned to their mission. In January 2022, the company open sourced their EC firmware. The company modifies the BIOS source code they bought from Insyde Software to meet their specific BIOS needs. The company's Linux Vendor Firmware Service (LVFS) with fwupd is in testing state. Framework Laptop Chromebook Edition uses an open source BIOS firmware, coreboot.

Marketplace 

The Framework Marketplace is an online store service hosted on the Framework website that primarily sells parts and tools that can be used to repair the Framework Laptop. These include, but are not limited to, replacement mainboards, audio modules, entire screen assemblies, and additional RAM and storage drives. The Marketplace also sells customization parts, including different colors of screen bezels, different keyboard layouts, and additional expansion cards. Notably, a "Carbon Capture" may be purchased for $100 US that makes "your Framework Laptop carbon neutral by buying one unit of carbon capture and sequestration." This essentially donates money directly to Running Tide, a company that is dedicated to removing carbon emissions from the atmosphere.

Battery life 

The battery life has been described as mediocre. The battery drains in a completely shut down state in BIOS version 3.07 or earlier with the 11th Intel Core mainboard, however the BIOS unofficial version 3.08 and later versions fix the issue.

Company or individually driven projects 

Third party companies and individuals make their projects in a Framework ecosystem.

In December 2022, Framework joined the 3D printing database site, Printables.com as a brand, highlighting the community projects.

Decoration 

 Framework Laptop skins & wraps
 Screen protector film
 Arts & wallpapers

Parts management 

 Module frame
 Parts tray

Expansion card 

 Magnetic charger expansion card
 Scroll wheels expansion card
 UART expansion card
 Solokeys Solo V2 expansion card

Hardware using expansion card 

 Box, a hardware for cloud storage alternative that uses Framework Expansion Cards.

Mainboard based 

 CJ64, a cyberdeck-like keyboard PC that re-purposes the Framework Laptop's mainboard
 Mainboard Terminal, a retro-style round display PC that uses the Framework Laptop's mainboard.
 Framedeck, a Framework mainboard based cyberdeck with clear acrylic and brass influenced by TRS-80 Model 100.
 A tablet that uses Framework parts including the mainboard. Framework-Tablet, a 3D printable tablet case.
 FrameStation, a modern game console case for the Framework mainboard.
 Framework Desktop Case Adapter, a 3D printable mount to adapt a Framework mainboard to ATX and MicroATX mainboards and cases.
 Framework Test Bench, a test and development bench for Framework mainboard.
 An aluminum 3D-printed mainboard case.
 Framework-AIO, a 3D printable case that converts Framework Laptop into an all-in-one (AIO) style desktop computer.
 DIY Triple Screen Laptop, a portable ergonomics computer with three screens (one panel, and two iPad Retina displays).

Display 

 Glider, a 60 fps E-ink replacement display.

Software 

 Embedded Controller Modifications, an EC tool that changes the colors of LEDs and the keyboard layout on the firmware level, plus a suite of tools for talking to and manipulating the EC.

Others 

 Framework input cover controller, a RP2040-based controller for the palmrest, connecting to the keyboard matrix, touchpad, power button, fingerprint sensor LEDs, keyboard backlight and CAPS LOCK LED.
 Adjustable laptop stand

Support 

The company supports by their knowledge base articles, community forum, QR codes on the products and parts, and inquiry form. The company's customer support is controversial. It has both positive reviews that they are transparent, honest, and customer-focused and negative reviews that they close the door.

Supported countries and regions 

Framework Laptop is available for order in the US, Canada, The UK, Germany, France, Ireland, The Netherlands and Austria. The company announced they will add additional countries in 2022, introducing their region selection page. In December 2021, the company announced that they chose the additional supported countries UK, Germany and France based on both the number of people who registered interest through the region selection page and on logistical complexity. In February 2022, pre-ordering became available for Ireland, Austria and The Netherlands. Pre-orders also opened in Australia in September 2022, with shipments arriving from October.

For people asking to buy Framework Laptop in their region, the company recommended that they wait until the company officially launches in their region before ordering. The company mentioned that if an import service was used, they would not be able to support the laptop or warranty.

Linux 

In December 2021, the company released a statement asking users who are not using Ubuntu 21.04.3+ or Fedora 35 to troubleshoot with Framework's Linux community instead of contacting Framework support as no other Linux distribution has been verified by the company for hardware compatibility, mentioning that the company could troubleshoot general product usage issues on a supported OS, but could not troubleshoot OS related issues not related to the product functionality. In April 2022, the company announced their Linux compatibility page.

BSD operating systems 

The company doesn't support BSD operating systems. In June 2022, the FreeBSD Foundation announced their work to ensure that the experience running FreeBSD on the Framework Laptop matches the stability that FreeBSD users expect.

ChromeOS 

In September 2022, the company announced the Framework Laptop Chromebook Edition with the pre-installed ChromeOS is available for pre-orders.

Electronics right to repair movement 

In June 2021, a venture capitalist investing in the company said "The conventional wisdom in the industry is that making products repairable makes them thicker, heavier, uglier, less robust, and more expensive. We’re here to prove that wrong and fix consumer electronics, one category at a time.". In October 2021, the company said "The core problem is the idea that consumer electronics are disposable.", and "Right to repair is incredibly important. It is actually a core part of what we are doing. Because increasingly products are not designed to be repaired." in interviews.

Framework Laptop was on display as part of the Waste Age: What can Design Do? exhibition displayed at the Design Museum in London from October 2021 to February 2022.

See also 
 Ethical consumerism
 Fairphone
 Shiftphone
 Social enterprise
 System76
 Purism
 Pine64

References

External links
 
 Framework Laptop - ArchWiki, the Arch Linux wiki site
 Framework Laptop - Gentoo Wiki, the Gentoo Linux wiki site
 Framework Laptop - FreeBSD Wiki, the FreeBSD wiki site

Computer companies of the United States
Consumer electronics brands
American brands
Netbook manufacturers
Online retailers of the United States